Goodwood Island is an island situated between the main channel of the Clarence River and the river's north Arm near Iluka and Woombah, New South Wales Australia. It has a large wharf at the Port of Yamba where ocean traders collect cargo to take to New Zealand, Lord Howe Island and Norfolk Island.

The island is home to a museum, called the Shed Gallery, which features photographs and other objects related to the sugar industry in northern New South Wales.

See also

List of islands of Australia

References

Islands of New South Wales
Northern Rivers